This is a list of presidents of the Florida Senate. In Florida, the president of the Senate is elected by the Senate membership to a two-year term.  They appoint committees and their chairs and route bills to the committees. They also co-ordinate with the chair of the Committee on Rules and Calendar on the ordering of bills on the calendar.  From 1865 to 1887, the lieutenant governor was the president of the Senate.

1845 James A. Berthelot 
1846 D. H. Mays 
1847 Daniel G. McLean 
1848 Erasmus Darwin Tracy 
1850 Robert J. Floyd
1854 Hamlin Valentine Snell
1856 Philip Dell 
1858 John Finlayson 
1860 Thomas Jefferson Eppes 
1861 Thomas Jefferson Eppes 
1862 Enoch J. Vann 
1863 Enoch J. Vann 
1864 Abraham K. Allison
Office held by Lieutenant Governor ex officio from 1865 until 1887
1889 Joseph B. Wall
1891 Jefferson B. Browne
1893 William H. Reynolds
1895 Frederick T. Myers 
1897 Charles J. Perrenot 
1899 Frank Adams 
1901 Thomas Palmer 
1903 Frank Adams 
1905 Park M. Trammell 
1907 W. Hunt Harris
1909 Frederick M. Hudson 
1911 Frederick Preston Cone  
1913 Herbert J. Drane 
1915 Charles E. Davis
1917 J. B. Johnson
1919 James E. Calkins 
1921 William A. MacWilliams 
1923 Theodore Tiffany Turnbull 
1925 John Stansel Taylor 
1927 Samuel W.Anderson 
1929 Jesse J. Parrish 
1931 Patrick C. Whitaker 
1933 Truman G. Futch 
1935 William C. Hodges 
1937 D. Stuart Gillis 
1939 J. Turner Butler 
1941 John R. Beacham 
1943 Philip D. Beall
1945 Walter W. Rose
1947 Scott Dilworth Clarke 
1949 Newman Collins Brackin
1951 Wallace E. Sturgis 
1953 Charley E. Johns 
1955 W. Turner Davis 
1957 William A. Shands 
1959 Dewey M. Johnson 
1961 W. Randolph Hodges 
1962–1963 	F. Wilson Carraway
1965 	James E. Connor 
1966–1968 	Verle A. Pope 
1969–1970 	John E. Mathews, Jr. 
1971–1972 	Jerry Thomas 
1973–1974 	Mallory E. Horne
1974 	Louis A. de la Parte, Jr. 
1975–1976 	Dempsey J. Barron
1977–1978 	Lew Brantley 
1979–1980 	Philip D. Lewis 
1981–1982 	Wyon D. Childers 
1983–1984 	N. Curtis Peterson, Jr. 
1985–1986 	Harry A. Johnston, II 
1987–1988 	John W. Vogt 
1989–1990 	Robert B. Crawford 
1991–1992 	Gwen Margolis 
1992–1993 	Ander Crenshaw
1993–1994 	Pat Thomas
1995–1996 	James A. Scott 
1997–1998 	Toni Jennings 
1999–2000 	Toni Jennings 
November 2000–November 2002 John M. McKay 
November 2002–November 2004 Jim King 
November 16 2004–November 21 2006 Tom Lee 
November 2006–November 2008 Ken Pruitt
November 2008–November 2010 Jeffrey Atwater
November 2010–November 2012 Mike Haridopolos
November 20 2012–November 18 2014 Don Gaetz
November 18 2014–November 22 2016 Andy Gardiner
November 22 2016-November 20 2018 Joe Negron
November 20 2018-November 17 2020 Bill Galvano
November 17 2020-November 22 2022 Wilton Simpson
November 22 2022-present Kathleen Passidomo

See also 
 Florida Democratic Party
 List of Florida state legislatures

References 

Government of Florida
Presidents of the Florida Senate